Baobabs in the Basement is the debut album by Fire Flies, released in 2005.

Track listing
"More Than This" – 4:04
"Welcome to Our Neck of the Woods" – 3:50
"Come Back to Life" – 4:10
"Simple Device" – 4:26
"So New" – 2:58
"All the Aliens" – 5:05
"Dreams Love Faces" – 4:43
"Microscope Eyes" – 3:47
"The Takeoff" – 9:53
"Note On The Kitchen Table" – 3:26

Personnel
Dan Romer – vocals, synthesizers, keyboards, acoustic guitar
Wil Farr – lead guitar
Matt Krahula – bass guitar
Seth Faulk – drums
Andrew Futral* – synthesizers, keyboards

2005 debut albums
Fire Flies albums